Vysoky is a stratovolcano located in the southern part of Kamchatka Peninsula, Russia.

"Высокий" means "tall" or "high" in Russian.

See also
 List of volcanoes in Russia

References
 

Mountains of the Kamchatka Peninsula
Volcanoes of the Kamchatka Peninsula
Stratovolcanoes of Russia
Holocene stratovolcanoes
Holocene Asia